The Atlanta Consolidated Street Railway was an attempt by Joel Hurt to take over the various Atlanta streetcar systems.

Incorporated in May 1891, Hurt began negotiations to consolidate widely overlapping competing companies. On September 21, 1891, the titles of the following were conveyed to the Consolidated:

Atlanta Street Railway owned by Edward C. Peters
Gate City Street Railroad
Fulton County Street Railroad
West End and Atlanta Street Railroad
Atlanta and Edgewood Street Railroad already owned by Hurt

The fully steam-powered Metropolitan Street Railroad was absorbed on November 22, 1892.
Only the Atlanta & Edgewood was completely electrified and they began work to convert the others. There were three small companies left outside of the system at the time (two headed to the northwest and one down to the barracks at Fort McPherson) but by the mid-1890s many more competitors were built.

Hurt continued with the electrification project having to contract for more and more power from Henry M. Atkinson while fighting a public relations battle over a perception of monopoly.

By 1899 Hurt and Atkinson were feuding in what has come to be called the "Second Battle of Atlanta" which resulted in the formation of Georgia Railway and Electric Company (predecessor of Georgia Power) combining all existing companies in 1902.

See also
Streetcars in Atlanta
Timeline of mass transit in Atlanta
Nine-Mile Circle line of the Consolidated

History of Atlanta
Defunct public transport operators in the United States
Companies based in Atlanta
Railway lines in Atlanta